Paolo Ignazio Maria Thaon di Revel (2 May 1888 – 1 June 1973) was an Italian politician and fencer. He was the son of Count Vittorio Thaon di Revel and Elfrida Maria Atkinson. He fought in the First World War. He was also Mayor of Torino (1929–35) and Italian Minister of Finance (1935–43) in the Mussolini Cabinet. After the war, he was president of the organising committee of the 1956 Winter Olympics at Cortina d'Ampezzo.
 
He won a gold medal in the team épée event at the 1920 Summer Olympics.

References

1888 births
1973 deaths
Sportspeople from Toulon
Members of the Grand Council of Fascism
Finance ministers of Italy
Mussolini Cabinet
Members of the Senate of the Kingdom of Italy
Italian male fencers
Olympic fencers of Italy
Fencers at the 1920 Summer Olympics
Olympic gold medalists for Italy
Olympic medalists in fencing
Medalists at the 1920 Summer Olympics
International Olympic Committee members
Recipients of the Order of Saints Maurice and Lazarus